Bifidobacterium animalis is a gram-positive, anaerobic, rod-shaped bacterium of the Bifidobacterium genus which can be found in the large intestines of most mammals, including humans.

Bifidobacterium animalis and Bifidobacterium lactis were previously described as two distinct species. Presently, both are considered B. animalis with the subspecies Bifidobacterium animalis subsp. animalis and Bifidobacterium animalis subsp. lactis.

Both old names B. animalis and B. lactis are still used on product labels, as this species is frequently used as a probiotic. In most cases, which subspecies is used in the product is not clear.

Trade names 
Several companies have attempted to trademark particular strains, and as a marketing technique, have invented scientific-sounding names for the strains.

Danone (Dannon in the United States) markets the subspecies strain  as Bifidus Digestivum (UK), Bifidus Regularis (US and Mexico), Bifidobacterium Lactis or B.L. Regularis (Canada), DanRegularis (Brazil), Bifidus Actiregularis (Argentina, Austria, Belgium, Bulgaria, Chile, Czech Republic, France, Germany, Greece, Hungary, Israel, Italy, Kazakhstan, Netherlands, Portugal, Romania, Russia, South Africa, Spain and the UK), and Bifidus Essensis in the Middle East (and formerly in Hungary, Bulgaria, Romania and The Netherlands) through Activia from Safi Danone KSA.

Chr. Hansen A/S from Denmark has a similar claim on a strain of Bifidobacterium animalis subsp. lactis, marketed under the trademark BB-12.

Lidl lists "Bifidobacterium BB-12" in its "Proviact" yogurt.

Bifidobacterium lactis Bl-04 and Bi-07 are strains from DuPont's Danisco FloraFIT range. They are used in many dietary probiotic supplements.

Theralac contains the strains Bifidobacterium lactis BI-07 and Bifidobacterium lactis BL-34 (also called BI-04) in its probiotic capsule.

Bifidobacterium lactis HN019 is a strain from Fonterra licensed to DuPont, which markets it as HOWARU Bifido. It is sold in a variety of commercial probiotics, among them Tropicana Products Essentials Probiotics, Attune Wellness Bars and NOW Foods Clinical GI Probiotic. Fonterra has a yogurt that is sold in New Zealand called Symbio Probalance, where the strain is labelled as DR10.

Research 

Bifidobacterim animalis subspecies lactis BB-12 administered in combination with other probiotics has showed "a trend toward increased remission" in a study of 32 patients with ulcerative colitis.

Products 

B. animalis is present in many food products and dietary supplements. The probiotic is mostly found in dairy products.

Health concerns 
The manipulation of the gut flora is complex and may cause bacteria-host interactions. Although probiotics, in general, are considered safe, there are concerns about their use in certain cases. Some people, such as those with compromised immune systems, short bowel syndrome, central venous catheters, heart valve disease and premature infants, may be at higher risk for adverse events. Rarely, consumption of probiotics may cause bacteremia, and sepsis, potentially fatal infections in children with lowered immune systems or who are already critically ill.

References

External links 

 whatisbifidusregularis.org/ – A deconstruction of the terms Bifidus Actiregularis, Bifidus Regularis, Bifidus Digestivum, L. Casei Immunitas and their variants, as well as the marketing strategy, and information about the potential health benefits of live yoghurts.
 Food-Info.net – How to select a probiotic
Type strain of Bifidobacterium animalis at BacDive - the Bacterial Diversity Metadatabase

Bifidobacteriales
Bacteriology
Digestive system
Probiotics
Bacteria described in 1969